Krościenko can refer to three villages in Poland:
Krościenko nad Dunajcem, Lesser Poland Voivodeship
Krościenko Wyżne, Subcarpathian Voivodeship
Krościenko, Bieszczady County in Subcarpathian Voivodeship (south-east Poland)